Lancefield grouping is a system of classification that classifies catalase-negative Gram-positive cocci based on the carbohydrate composition of bacterial antigens found on their cell walls. The system, created by Rebecca Lancefield, was historically used to organize the various members of the family Streptococcaceae, which includes the genera Lactococcus and Streptococcus, but now is largely superfluous due to explosive growth in the number of streptococcal species identified since the 1970s. However, it has retained some clinical usefulness even after the taxonomic changes, and as of 2018, Lancefield designations are still often used to communicate medical microbiological test results. 

Enterococcus, formerly known as group D streptococcus, were classified as members of the genus Streptococcus until 1984 and are included in the original Lancefield grouping. Many - but not all - species of streptococcus are beta-hemolytic. Notably, enterococci and Streptococcus bovis (Lancefield group D) are not beta-hemolytic. Though there are many groups of streptococcus, only five are known to commonly cause disease in immune-competent human beings: group A, group B, both members of group D (Streptococcus gallolyticus and Streptococcus infantarius, both members of the Streptococcus bovis group), and two groups that lack the Lancefield carbohydrate antigen: Streptococcus pneumoniae and viridans streptococci.

Classification
Group A - Streptococcus pyogenes
Group B - Streptococcus agalactiae
Group C - Streptococcus equisimilis, Streptococcus equi, Streptococcus zooepidemicus, Streptococcus dysgalactiae
Group D - Enterococcus faecalis,  Enterococcus faecium, Enterococcus durans and Streptococcus bovis
Group F, G & L - Streptococcus anginosus
Group H - Streptococcus sanguis
Group K - Streptococcus salivarius
Group L - Streptococcus dysgalactiae
Group M & O - Streptococcus mitis
Group N - Lactococcus lactis
Group R & S - Streptococcus suis

Other Streptococcus species are classified as 'non-Lancefield streptococci'.

References

Bacteriology
Microbiology techniques